The 2003–04 Argentine First Division season saw Boca Juniors ecstatic after a title run that also included the Intercontinental Cup. River Plate stole the Clausura leaving hated rival Boca Juniors looking up from second place.

Four teams were relegated, Chacarita, Nueva Chicago, Atlético de Rafaela and Talleres de Córdoba.  The first two lost a direct relegation, their places occupied by Club Almagro and Instituto de Córdoba. The last two lost their "promotion" games against Huracán de Tres Arroyos and Argentinos Juniors, respectively.

Torneo Apertura ("Opening" Tournament)

Top Scorers

Relegation

There is no relegation after the Apertura. For the relegation results of this tournament see below

Torneo Clausura ("Closing" Tournament)

Top Scorers

Relegation

"Promoción" Playoff

Huracán de Tres Arroyos wins 5-3 and is promoted to Argentine First Division.
Atlético Rafaela is relegated to the Argentine Nacional B.

Argentinos Juniors wins 4-2 and is promoted to Argentine First Division.
Talleres de Córdoba is relegated to the Argentine Nacional B.

Argentine clubs in international competitions

Lower leagues

National team
This section covers Argentina's games from August 1, 2003 to July 31, 2004.

Friendly matches

2006 World Cup qualifiers

2004 Copa América

External links
AFA
Argentina 2003–2004 by Javier Romiser at RSSSF.

 
Seasons in Argentine football
Argentina
Argentina

es:Torneo Clausura 2004 (Argentina)
ko:아르헨티나 프리메라 디비시온 2003-04
it:Primera División 2003-2004 (Argentina)
pl:I liga argentyńska w piłce nożnej (2003/2004)
zh:阿根廷足球甲级联赛2003–2004赛季